Multijet is Fiat Chrysler Automobiles' term for its current common rail direct injection turbodiesel engine range. Most of the Fiat, Alfa Romeo, Lancia range as well as certain Chrysler, RAM Trucks, Jeep and Maserati vehicles are equipped with Multijet engines. Ownership of some Fiat Multijet designs is shared with General Motors as part of a settlement of the failed merger between the two auto conglomerates. GM Powertrain Torino group in Turin, Italy manages their interest in these engines. Some PSA Peugeot Citroën diesel engines are also rebadged JTD units, and vice versa. Fiat's common rail diesel engine is also known as JTD, an initialism of Jet Turbo Diesel.

Characteristics 
The property that distinguishes the Multijet from previous generations of common rail diesel engines from FCA is the combustion of the fuel, which is split into multiple injections, thus allowing for a more complete, quieter combustion in the cylinder. Compared to the first-generation JTD engines (Unijet system) which only featured a smaller pilot and a larger main injection, Multijet is capable of up to five injections per combustion cycle which enables better, more efficient cold running, better performance especially in the lower rev-range, quieter operation as well as even lower consumptions and emissions. The time between injections has been reduced to 150 microseconds while the minimal injection quantity has been reduced from two to less than one microlitre.

This enables even mid-sized sedans like the Alfa Romeo 156 and Lancia Lybra equipped with the 1.9 JTD to achieve fuel economy upwards of 45 mpgUS (55 mpgimp or 5L/100 km) on country roads and highways while offering an equal amount of torque as the 3.0L 24V V6 engine.

A sophisticated electronic control unit controls the injection and changes the injection logic and number of injections based on a multitude of parameters, most importantly revolutions per minute of the engine, engine torque requested by the driver and the temperature of the coolant.

The injection pressure of the diesel fuel on the second-generation Multijet is limited to between  bar ( psi) on the 1.3 Multijet and  bar ( psi) on the 2.4 Multijet 20V.

Multijet II 
In 2009 Fiat Powertrain introduced the third generation of this technology, called Multijet II. With its new and innovative injectors with hydraulically balanced solenoid valve and even higher injection pressure of 2,000 bar (29,000 psi) it is capable of even more precise controlling of the injected diesel fuel, injecting it in a quicker and more flexible manner. It enables up to eight consecutive injections per combustion cycle and implemented Injection Rate Shaping technology, which provides two very close pilot injections making the fuel delivery more continuous and modulated. This results in an engine that is quiet and has a smoother operation, lower emissions, better fuel mileage and higher performance compared to the previous generation.

Automotive engines

1.0

A  3-cylinder variant, (called XSDE, Xtra Smart Diesel Engine) or Smartech Diesel, was introduced in 2011.

Applications:
 2011–2017 Chevrolet Beat (India)

1.3 Multijet

A small 1.3 L version (called the SDE, Small Diesel Engine) introduced in February 2003 is produced in Bielsko-Biała, Poland, in Ranjangaon, Pune, India, by Fiat India Automobiles and Tata Motors joint venture plant since 2008, and by Maruti Suzuki in Gurgaon, Haryana, India since 2012. The Multijet 75 PS version was chosen in 2005 as the International Engine of the Year in the 1-litre to 1.4-litre category.

The engine is able to meet Euro IV pollution standards without the use of a diesel particulate filter.

In January 2008, Tata Motors introduced the new Indica Vista model, which features new Quadrajet branded version of this engine. The second generation Ford Ka uses 1.3 Multijet named as Duratorq TDCi. In GM nomenclature, it is called Small Diesel Engine (SDE).

During 2009, Fiat launched a new generation badged Multijet II, with a new injection management system (up to 8 injections per cycle, instead of 5) and able to meet Euro V pollution standards.

As of 2013, more than 5 million 1.3 MultiJet engines were produced. In January 2020, the production of the 1.3 Multijet ended in India in both Maruti Suzuki plant and Fiat-Tata JV as the BS6 emission regulations come into effect in the country from 1 April 2020. Fiat-Tata built a total of 800,048 engines over 12 years.

Applications:

FCA 

 Alfa Romeo MiTo
 Fiat 500
 Fiat 500L
Fiat Albea
Fiat Doblò
Fiat Fiorino
Fiat Grande Punto
Fiat Idea
Fiat Linea
Fiat Palio
Fiat Panda
Fiat Punto
Fiat Qubo
Fiat Strada
Fiat Tipo (2015)
Lancia Musa
Lancia Ypsilon

General Motors 

Chevrolet Aveo (2012)
Chevrolet Sail (India)
Chevrolet Spin (Indonesia)
Opel Agila
Opel Astra
Opel Combo
Opel Corsa
Opel Meriva
Opel Tigra TwinTop

PSA 

 Citroën Nemo
 Peugeot Bipper

Suzuki 

Suzuki Baleno
Suzuki Ciaz
Suzuki Dzire
Suzuki Ertiga
Suzuki Ignis
Suzuki Splash
Suzuki Swift
Suzuki SX4 Sedan
Suzuki SX4 S-Cross
Suzuki Vitara Brezza

Tata Motors 

Tata Bolt
Tata Indica Vista
Tata Indigo Manza
Tata Zest

Others 

DFSK Super Cab (Indonesia)
Ford Ka (2008)
Premier Rio

1.6 Multijet

The new 1.6 Multijet diesel with 105 PS was released in December 2007, the 120 PS version arrived later in 2008.

Applications:

FCA 

Alfa Romeo Mito
Alfa Romeo Giulietta (2010)
Fiat 500L
Fiat Bravo (2007)
Fiat Doblò
Fiat Grande Punto
Fiat Idea
Fiat Linea
Fiat Tipo (2015)
Jeep Renegade
Jeep Compass
Lancia Delta (2008)
Lancia Musa

General Motors 

Opel Combo D

Suzuki 

Suzuki Vitara (2015)
Suzuki SX4 S-Cross (from 2013)

1.9 

The most common JTD engine is the 1.9 L straight-4 found on various brands and models. The first car that used this engine was Alfa Romeo 156 in 1997, making it the world's first common-rail diesel passenger car.

The Multijet second generation features an advanced common-rail system and is available with seven different power outputs. Except for the 101 PS Multijet, all engines feature a variable-geometry turbocharger.

Opel also uses a version of this engine. Their CDTI engine, manufactured in Pratola Serra, Italy and Kaiserslautern, Germany, is the product of the half-decade joint venture between GM and Fiat.  It is used in the Vectra, Signum, Astra, Zafira, Cadillac BLS and Suzuki SX4 as well as some Saabs marked as TiD and TTiD (twinturbo version).

Applications

FCA

Alfa Romeo 145
Alfa Romeo 146
Alfa Romeo 147
Alfa Romeo 156
Alfa Romeo 159
Alfa Romeo GT
Cadillac BLS
DR5
Fiat Bravo
Fiat Brava
Fiat Croma II
Fiat Doblò
Fiat Grande Punto
Fiat Marea
Fiat Multipla
Fiat Punto
Fiat Sedici
Fiat Stilo
Fiat Strada
Lancia Delta
Lancia Lybra
Lancia Musa

General Motors 

Cadillac BLS
Opel Astra H
Opel Signum
Opel Vectra C
Opel Zafira B
Saab 9-3
Saab 9-5

Suzuki 

Suzuki SX4

Others 

Alenia Aeronautica Sky-Y

SAIC Motor 
MG 6

Gallery

Twin Turbo

This engine will be sold both to Fiat Group Automobiles and other brands, but the  version is reserved only to Fiat Group Automobiles.

Applications:

Cadillac BLS
Lancia Delta
Saab 9-3

2.0 Multijet II

A new 2 litre (1,956 cc, 83 mm bore, 90.4 mm stroke) Multijet diesel was introduced in third generation Lancia Delta in summer 2008. At its first version this engine produces . For 2009 the engine was fitted to Alfa Romeo 159 as  variant. Fiat Sedici, Suzuki SX4 and the new Fiat Doblò generation use a  variant of this engine.

GM Powertrain separately developed their diesel engines based on 1.9 JTD, after end of the GM and Fiat partnership, and first was the  version for Astra and Insignia, which was later upgraded to 165 PS for Astra (163 PS in restyled version of Insignia), and less powerful version for Insignia with 110 PS and 130 PS. The same engine was also available in the 2011 Saab 9–5 with 160 PS and 190 PS twin-turbo. In 2013 Opel introduced cleaner and more fuel efficient versions of the 2.0 CDTI engine and the ecoFLEX version, with 99 g/km of CO2 and 120 PS (140 PS for Insignia).

Applications:

FCA 

Alfa Romeo Giulietta (2010)
Alfa Romeo 159
Fiat Bravo (2007)
Fiat Doblò II
Fiat Ducato III
Fiat Freemont
Fiat Sedici
Fiat Croma II
Fiat Toro
Jeep Compass
Jeep Cherokee (KL)
Jeep Renegade
Lancia Delta III

General Motors 
2014–2015 Chevrolet Cruze (NA)
 2016-2017 Chevrolet Captiva (KOR)
 2013-2015 Chevrolet Malibu
Opel/Vauxhall Astra J (single and twin turbo)
Opel/Vauxhall Cascada (single and twin turbo)
Opel/Vauxhall Insignia (single and twin turbo)
Opel/Vauxhall Zafira Tourer (single and twin turbo)
Saab 9-5 (single and twin turbo)
2020 Cadillac XT4 (EU market)

SAIC Motor 

 MG Hector

Suzuki 

Suzuki SX4

Tata Motors 

Tata Harrier
Tata Safari

2.2 Multijet II

The 2.2 Multijet II (2,184 cc) was introduced by Fiat Chrysler in mid-2015. It was developed to offer more torque in the low-rev range compared to the 2.0L Multijet. This engine further improves the existing 2.0 Multijet in various areas, such as a higher injection pressure (2,000 Bar instead of 1,600 Bar) with Injector Rate Shaping, an oil pump with variable displacement and counterbalance-shafts to reduce noises and vibrations. This engine meets Euro 6 emission norms without the use of diesel exhaust fluid injection.

A 2.2 Multijet III (2,184 cc) was introduced by Stellantis on the Fiat Ducato in 2021 with 4 power outputs: 120, 140, 160, & 180 hp. It meets Euro 6d emissions standards.

A further development of this engine with a 2,143 cc displacement, and a die-cast Aluminium block, is used in the Alfa Romeo Giulia (952), Alfa Romeo Stelvio, and Jeep Wrangler (JL).

Applications:
Fiat Ducato 2,184 cc
Jeep Cherokee (KL) 2,184 cc
Jeep Wrangler (JL) 2,143 cc
Alfa Romeo Giulia (952) 2,143 cc
Alfa Romeo Stelvio (949) 2,143 cc

2.4

The 2.4 L (2,387 cc) straight-5 version is based on the 2.4  5 cylinder TD engine as used in the Mk1 Fiat Marea and the Mk1 Lancia Kappa. The JTD version benefits from the solid build of the TD block, and an improved head/injection system.

It was designed for transverse front-wheel drive use and was deemed too long and tall for widespread use in other GM Ecotec or Fiat products.

Applications:
Alfa Romeo 156
Alfa Romeo Spider
Alfa Romeo Brera
Alfa Romeo 159
Alfa Romeo 166
Fiat Croma II
Fiat Marea
Lancia Kappa
Lancia Lybra
Lancia Thesis

3.0 V6 Multijet II 
See List of VM Motori engines#A 630 DOHC.

Heavy-duty engines

2.3

The 2.3 Multijet (2,287 cc) was developed by Iveco for heavy-duty applications and is available in three versions 120 MultiJet (Sofim F1AE0481D), 130 MultiJet (Sofim F1AE0481N or F1AE6481D) and 150 MultiJet (Sofim F1AE3481E), these engines produce ,  and  respectively.

Applications:
Fiat Ducato
Iveco Daily
Karsan Jest
UAZ Patriot

2.8

Applications:
 Citroën Jumper
 Fiat Ducato
 Iveco Daily
 Iveco Massif
 Peugeot Boxer
 Renault Mascott

3.0

The 160 MultiJet Power, introduced in 2007, saw displacement increased to 3.0 L (2,998 cc). In Iveco Massif this engine is also available as  version.

Applications:
 Citroën Jumper
 Fiat Ducato
 Iveco Daily
 Iveco Massif/Campagnola
 Mitsubishi Canter
 Multicar Fumo
 Peugeot Boxer
 RAM ProMaster
 Temsa Prestij
 Karsan Jestronic

See also
 Fully Integrated Robotised Engine
 Fiat Global Small Engine
 Fiat Pratola Serra modular engines

Notes

References
 
 
 
 

Fiat engines
General Motors engines
Diesel engines by model
Straight-three engines
Straight-four engines
Straight-five engines